The 1980–81 Coppa Italia, the 34th Coppa Italia was an Italian Football Federation domestic cup competition won by Roma.

Group stage

Group 1

Group 2

Group 3

Group 4

Group 5

Group 6

Group 7

Quarter-finals 
Join the defending champion: Roma.

Semi-finals

Final

First leg

Second leg

Top goalscorers

References 

 rsssf.com
 Official site
 Bracket

Coppa Italia seasons
Coppa Italia
Coppa Italia